Henry Bridges may refer to:
Henry Bridges (clockmaker) (1697–1754), English carpenter, showman and clockmaker
Henry Bridges (musician) (1915–1986), American jazz saxophonist
Henry L. Bridges (1907–2002), American lawyer and politician in North Carolina
Henry Styles Bridges (1898–1961), governor of New Hampshire and U.S. senator

See also
Henry Brydges (disambiguation)